PrepMe is a for-profit American company that offers online courses and tutoring for standardized achievement tests, in particular those offered by the Educational Testing Service (ETS), such as the PSAT and SAT; and the ACT offered by ACT, Inc. PrepMe also developed its Coursification platform to open its adaptive online learning platform to publishers. Over 100,000 students have used the company's programs.

History 
The company was founded in 2001 by Avichal Garg, Karan Goel, and Joe Jewell, Stanford, University of Chicago, and Caltech students respectively. It is based in Chicago with a software engineering team in Palo Alto, California.  One of the company's co-founders, Avichal Garg, a former Google product manager, raised investment capital from other former Google employees to fund PrepMe. The company was incubated at the University of Chicago Booth School of Business' Polsky Center for Entrepreneurship after it won the university's 2005 New Venture Challenge.

On February 1, 2007, Maine governor John Baldacci announced that for three years PrepMe planned to let every junior in Maine use its online SAT preparation program without cost to themselves, their school, or the state.  Office of the Governor Release.

In 2008, PrepMe was recognized at the Chicago Innovation Awards and was featured on the front cover of Fortune Small Business.

On May 28, 2013, Hobsons launched the PrepMe Vocabulary Quiz Facebook Game to help students practice for the SAT.

Acquisition 
In July 2011, PrepMe's adaptive learning platform was acquired by Ascend Learning backed by Providence Equity Capital, which also owns Blackboard Inc. and  Archipelago Learning.

The acquisition gave Ascend ownership of PrepMe's Coursification™ platform, a software service launched in March 2011 that enables customized online-learning courses. PrepMe continues to provide college readiness and preparation services under license from Ascend.

In February 2012, PrepMe's PSAT, SAT and ACT test preparation business was acquired by Naviance, a provider of college and career readiness solutions for high schools and other K-12 institutions.

References

External links
Official website

Standardized tests in the United States
Test preparation companies
Software companies based in Illinois
Educational technology companies of the United States
Companies based in Chicago
Companies based in Palo Alto, California
Defunct software companies of the United States